Krzysztof Zaleski (September 3, 1948 – October 20, 2008) was a Polish theater director and cinema actor.

Zaleski was born in Świętochłowice, Poland, on September 3, 1948. He graduated from Warsaw University's Department of Polish Studies in 1971. He further completed his studies at the State Higher Theatre School in Warsaw in 1986.

He received numerous awards throughout his career for his work within the Warsaw theater community. In 2007, Zaleski was awarded the Feliks’ Award for his adaptation of series of short stories originally written by Marek Nowakowski.

Zaleski worked as the Director of Polish Radio Drama. Additionally, he served as the director of Director of Polish Radio 2 for the last 18 months of his life.

Krzysztof Zaleski died on October 20, 2008, in Warsaw at the age of 59 after a long illness. He was survived by his wife, Polish actress Maria Pakulnis, and their son.

Filmography
 1976: Niedzielne dzieci
 1977: Indeks. Życie i twórczość Józefa M.
 1978: Zaległy urlop
 1978: Próba ognia i wody
 1978: Bez znieczulenia
 1979: Szansa
 1980: Gorączka
 1981: Kobieta samotna
 1981: Przypadek
 1981: Dziecinne pytania
 1981: Człowiek z żelaza
 1982: Głosy
 1985: Idol
 1985: Jezioro Bodeńskie
 1985: Kochankowie mojej mamy
 1985: Zabawa w chowanego
 1986: Zmiennicy - serial telewizyjny
 1987: O rany, nic się nie stało!!!
 1987: Zabij mnie glino
 1987: The Mother of Kings
 1988: Męskie sprawy
 1988: Obywatel Piszczyk
 1989: Konsul
 1991: 
 1992: Czarne słońca
 1992: Warszawa. Rok 5703
 1992: Tragarz puchu
 1993: Tylko strach
 1993: Samowolka
 1994: Miasto prywatne
 1995: Gracze
 1996: Ekstradycja 2
 1997: Sztos
 1999: O dwóch takich, co nic nie ukradli
 2000: Bajland
 2004: Cudownie ocalony
 2005: Dziki 2: Pojedynek
 2006: Letnia miłość
 2008: Drugi sztos

References

External links
 

1948 births
2008 deaths
People from Świętochłowice
Male actors from Warsaw
Polish male film actors
Polish theatre directors
University of Warsaw alumni
Polish male stage actors
Academic staff of the University of Warsaw
Aleksander Zelwerowicz National Academy of Dramatic Art in Warsaw alumni
Burials at Powązki Military Cemetery